The Evil That Men Do may refer to:

Literature
 "The evil that men do", a quotation from Act 3, scene ii of Julius Caesar by William Shakespeare
 The Evil That Men Do, a 1904 novel by M. P. Shiel
 The Evil That Men Do, a 1969 novel by John Brunner 
 The Evil That Men Do, a 1978 novel by R. Lance Hill
 The Evil That Men Do, a non-fiction book co-authored by retired FBI profiler Roy Hazelwood
 The Evil That Men Do (Buffy novel), an original novel based on the television series Buffy the Vampire Slayer
 Spider-Man/Black Cat: The Evil That Men Do, a comic book limited series published by Marvel Comics

Cinema
 The Evil That Men Do (film), 1984 film starring Charles Bronson

Music
 "The Evil That Men Do" (song), by Iron Maiden on Seventh Son of a Seventh Son
 "Evil That Men Do", a song by Queen Latifah on All Hail the Queen
 "The Evil That Men Do", a song by Yo La Tengo on Ride the Tiger